The Weches Formation is a greensand, slay, and shale geologic formation in Louisiana and Eastern Texas. It preserves fossils dating back to the Paleogene period, specifically the Eocene.

Description
The Weches Formation is a fossiliferous glauconite rich sand that graduates into a clay. It is considered one of the principal iron bearing beds in Eastern Texas, and is mined for sand in gravel in parts of Texas where exposed. The Weches Formation was originally called the Weches Greensand, and was considered a member of the Mount Selman Formation before being raised to formation status.

See also

 List of fossiliferous stratigraphic units in Louisiana
 List of fossiliferous stratigraphic units in Texas
 Paleontology in Louisiana
 Paleontology in Texas

References

 

Paleogene Louisiana
Paleogene geology of Texas